Udachnoye is a rural locality (a selo) and the administrative center of Udachensky Selsoviet of Akhtubinsky District, Astrakhan Oblast, Russia. The population was 681 as of 2010. There are 12 streets.

Geography 
Udachnoye is located 86 km southeast of Akhtubinsk (the district's administrative centre) by road. Verblyuzhy is the nearest rural locality.

References 

Rural localities in Akhtubinsky District